Charisma.com is a Japanese electro/rap duo which formed in 2011. and made up of MC Itsuka and  DJ Gonchi. The musicians work as office ladies at the same time as performing. In 2015, the group made their major label debut with Warner Music Japan.

The duo went on indefinite hiatus in December 2017.

Biography 
Members Itsuka and Gonchi first met when they were junior high school classmates; however, they had never collaborated musically until adulthood. After Itsuka graduated high school and went to university, she joined her friend's rock band as the vocalist. When that group later disbanded, Itsuka wanted to continue in the music business. Gonchi was experienced with turntables, as her brother was a DJ, so Itsuka contacted Gonchi to start a duo. Gonchi accepted, having no plans after returning from studying overseas and waiting for university to begin. The group originally intended to create rock music. However, Itsuka became interested in rapping after performing rapped lyrics in karaoke settings; she eventually decided that her rap skills were better than her singing skills, and decided to rap in Charisma.com. "Charisma" was originally a nickname Itsuka had been given by her vocalist friend. After adding more people, she added the ".com" to represent the word "company", unaware at the time that the domain name .com referred to the word "commercial".

Charisma.com created a blog on Ameblo and posted their first entry on October 1, 2011. The group uploaded their first song, "Hate", to YouTube on July 9, 2012. At the same time, Itsuka worked with 07ch Records, collaborating with C.R.E.A.M Sodaz on their Kissa Dark Side album in November 2011, and releasing her own extended play Majo EP under the name  in September 2012. The group uploaded their second song, "George", to YouTube on February 7, 2013.

Due to the popularity of their videos on YouTube, the group were able to release their debut extended play Ai Ai Syndrome on July 10, 2013. The release was promoted with a new recording of "Hate", which managed to chart in the top 50 of Billboard'''s Japan Hot 100 singles chart. Ai Ai Syndrome was well-received critically, being awarded at the 2014 CD Shop Awards for best Kantō region artist. The release impressed iTunes Japan staff, who listed them in their annual list of new artists who they expect to break into mainstream music in 2014.

In April 2014, Itsuka announced the return of her solo project Meliyas, and released a full-length album Majo LP exclusively to 500 members of the Charisma.com fanclub. It was later given a wide release in November 2014.

The group's debut studio album Distopping was released on June 4, 2014. This was followed by "Mirra Killer", a digital single collaborating with dance troupe Tempura Kidz. In early 2015, Charisma.com performed the theme song for the live action film adaptation of Tomohiro Koizumi's manga Shinda Me o Shita Shōnen, entitled "Tongari Young"; in April 2015 they released the single "Kongara Girl", which was written to promote Tangle Teezer-brand hair brushes.

In July 2015, Charisma.com released their first extended play under major label Warner Music Japan, OLest.

On December 8, 2017, Charisma.com announce that it was going on indefinite hiatus. Gonchi decided to retire from the entertainment industry to help out with her family's business. The duo's final activity was a farewell concert held at Zepp Tokyo on January 27, 2018.

On September 8, 2018, a new single Introduction Tekina (的な) was released on the charismadotcom Youtube channel.

 Members 
 is the group's MC and lyricist.
 is the group's DJ, who is in charge of turn tables.

 Musical style 

Charisma.com's sound was inspired by Japanese hip-hop group Astro, which inspired Itsuka to make music featuring rapping on top of a constant dance beat.

The group's songs begin after Itsuka requests music made by trackmakers. After she receives them, she adds lyrics and a melody. Both members continue to work their jobs as office ladies in addition to being members of Charisma.com. Itsuka works at the office of a magazine, while Gonchi works at a company specialising in precision machinery. Much of Charisma.com's music is inspired by everyday happenings in offices, especially the difference between life as a musician compared to life as an office lady.

Itsuka's lyrics when she first began performing music were originally more about love, however the longer she worked as an office lady, the more she sang about society and angrier things. During Distopping'', most of her songs were from the point of view of other people, including her younger sister, her coworkers or is inspired by snatches of conversation on the train.

Critics have focused praise on Charisma.com for Itsuka's lyric style and rapping.

Discography

Studio albums

Compilation albums

Extended plays

Promotional singles

Bibliography

Notes

References

External links 

 
 Official blog

2011 establishments in Japan
Japanese electronic music groups
Japanese hip hop groups
Musical groups established in 2011
Musical groups from Kanagawa Prefecture
Japanese musical duos
Warner Music Japan artists